Indonesia's Got Talent (season 1) or Indonesia's Got Talent 2010 is the first season of the talent show Indonesia's Got Talent. Initially this program had been designed and prepared in 2008 to be broadcast on Indosiar. However, in reality this program was finally launched in mid-2010.

Host & Judges

Host 
 Tora Sudiro
 Vincent Rompies

Judges 
 Vina Panduwinata
 Anjasmara
 Ria Irawan

Sponsor 
 Kuku Bima Ener-G

Season overview

Top 56 (Semi-finals) 

The semi-finals began on September 25, 2010. Eight acts performed each week. A three-hour performance episode each Saturday was followed by an also three hour results show on Sunday, where four of the eight acts from the previous night remained in the competition. The judges' choice remained, as the judges got to decide whether the contestant who placed either in fourth or fifth place got to advance to the next round.

Elimination table, Week 1 

The performance episode aired on September 25, 2010.
The results episode aired on September 26, 2010.

Note
 Buzzed out
 Judges' choice

Elimination Table, Week 2 

The performance episode aired on October 2, 2010.
The results episode aired on October 3, 2010.

Note
 Buzzed out
 Judges' choice

Elimination Table, Week 3 

The performance episode aired on October 9, 2010.
The results episode aired on October 10, 2010.

Note
 Buzzed out
 Judges' choice

Elimination Table, Week 4 

The performance episode aired on October 16, 2010.
The results episode aired on October 17, 2010.

Note
 Buzzed out
 Judges' choice

Italics indicate the act was a wild card.

Elimination Table, Week 5 

The performance episode aired on October 23, 2010.
The results episode aired on October 24, 2010.

Note
 Buzzed out
 Judges' choice

Elimination Table, Week 6 

The performance episode aired on October 30, 2010.
The results episode aired on October 31, 2010.

Note
 Buzzed out
 Judges' choice

Elimination Table, Week 7 

The performance episode aired on November 6, 2010.
The results episode aired on November 7, 2010.

Note
 Buzzed out
 Judges' choice

Top 28 (Finals) 

The first episode of the Top 28 (Finals) performance was broadcast on November 13, 2010. Seven acts performed each week. A three-hour performance episode each Saturday was followed by an also three hour results show on Sunday, where three of the seven acts from the previous night remained in the competition. The judges' choice remained, as the judges got to decide whether the contestant who placed either in third or fourth place got to advance to the next round.

Elimination Table, Week 1 

The performance episode aired on November 13, 2010.
The results episode aired on November 14, 2010.

Note
 Buzzed out
 Judges' choice

Italics indicate the act was a wild card. Order indicates when the act performed during the performance episode.

Elimination Table, Week 2 

The performance episode aired on November 20, 2010.
The results episode aired on November 21, 2010.

Note
 Buzzed out
 Judges' choice

Italics indicate the act was a wild card. Order indicates when the act performed during the performance episode.

Elimination Table, Week 3 

The performance episode aired on November 27, 2010.
The results episode aired on November 28, 2010.

Note
 Buzzed out
 Judges' choice

Italics indicate the act was a wild card. Order indicates when the act performed during the performance episode.

Elimination Table, Week 4 

The performance episode aired on December 4, 2010.
The results episode aired on December 5, 2010.

Note
 Buzzed out
 Judges' choice

Italics indicate the act was a wild card. Order indicates when the act performed during the performance episode.

Top 12 (Go To Grand Final) 

The TOP 12 began on December 11, 2010. Six acts performed each week. A three-hour performance episode each Saturday was followed by an also three hour results show on Sunday, where three of the six acts from the previous night remained in the competition. The judges' choice remained, as the judges got to decide whether the contestant who placed either in third or fourth place got to advance to the next round.

Elimination Table, Week 1 

The performance episode aired on December 11, 2010.
The results episode aired on December 12, 2010.

Note
 Buzzed out
 Judges' choice

Italics indicate the act was a wild card. Order indicates when the act performed during the performance episode.

Elimination Table, Week 2 

The performance episode aired on December 18, 2010.
The results episode aired on December 19, 2010.

Note
 Buzzed out
 Judges' choice

Italics indicate the act was a wild card. Order indicates when the act performed during the performance episode.

Grand Final 
The Grand Final aired on Saturday, December 25, 2010, 2 hour.

The season finale aired on Sunday, December 26, 2010, 3 hours and featured performances from finalist who have been eliminated on previous rounds: IGT Dancers (X'tra Ordinary, Bogie Papeda, and To The Point), IGT Band (Edwin Putro Mulyono, Lucky Family Band, Zachi Ali, Ion Mubarok, Deden Hidayat, and Melis Guraici), Beauty Fiction, and IGT Tenors (The Brothers, Hernawan Eko, and Aloysius Budi).

Key

References 

 KapanLagi.com: Indonesia's Got Talent Bukan Copy-Paste!
 KapanLagi.com: Indonesia's Got Talent, Ajang Pencarian Talenta Super Indonesia
 KapanLagi.com: Indonesia's Got Talent Tampilkan Bakat Luar Biasa
 Tabloid Bintang: Indonesia's Got Talent Siap Bersaing!
 Tabloid Bintang: Indonesia's Got Talent Mulai Menebar Pesona
 Indosiar.com: Indonesia's Got Talent Curi Perhatian 
 Indosiar.com: Ajang Pencarian Bakat Berlabel Internasional

External links 
  

Got Talent
Indonesian reality television series
Television series by Fremantle (company)
2010 Indonesian television series debuts
2010 Indonesian television series endings
Indonesian television series based on British television series
Indosiar original programming